Mikimiki , a Māori term may refer to one of several species in the genus Coprosma. These include:

 Coprosma areolata
 Coprosma propinqua
 Coprosma rubra
 Coprosma virescens
 Coprosma rigida
 Coprosma dumosa